The National Film Award for Best Lyrics (the Silver Lotus Award) is an honour presented annually at the National Film Awards by the Directorate of Film Festivals (DFF) to a lyricist who has composed the best song for films produced within the Indian film industry. The award was first introduced at the 16th National Film Awards in 1969. It was intermittently awarded until the 22nd National Film Awards (1975). From then on, no award was presented until the 32nd National Film Awards (1985). However, since 1985 every year the award has been presented with the exception of the 34th National Film Awards (1987). As of the 68th National Film Awards (2020), the DFF has presented a total of 44 awards to 30 different lyricists.

Although the Indian film industry produces films in around 20 languages and dialects, the recipients of the award include those who have worked in seven major languages: Hindi (17 awards), Tamil (11 awards), Bengali, Kannada & Malayalam (4 awards), Telugu (3 awards), Punjabi (1 award).

Tamil poet Kannadasan was the first recipient of the award. He won the prize for his work in the 1967 Tamil film Kuzhanthaikkaga. The lyricist who won the most Rajat Kamal awards is Vairamuthu (Tamil) with seven wins, followed by Javed Akhtar (Hindi) with five wins. Four lyricists: Gulzar (Hindi), Swanand Kirkire (Hindi), Prasoon Joshi (Hindi) and Na. Muthukumar (Tamil) have won the award on two occasions. The most recent recipient is Manoj Muntashir who will be honoured at the 68th National Film Awards for his work in 2020 Hindi language film, Saina.

Multiple winners 
 7 Wins: Vairamuthu (Tamil)
 5 Wins: Javed Akhtar (Hindi)
 2 Wins: Gulzar (Hindi), Swanand Kirkire (Hindi), Prasoon Joshi (Hindi) and Na. Muthukumar (Tamil)

List of recipients

References

External links 
 Official Page for Directorate of Film Festivals, India
 National Film Awards Archives

Lyrics